is a publishing company based in Kyoto, Japan. Founded in 1948, it specializes in academic publishing, especially in the psychology, education and social welfare areas. Its annual total sales is about ¥500,000,000, or $5 million.

The head office is located at 12-8 Murasakino-junibocho, Kita-ku, Kyoto. The present CEO is Kazuaki Seki.

Kitaooji Shobo published Chibikuro Sampo, a non-racist Japanese version of Helen Bannerman's The Story of Little Black Sambo, in 1997. The reviser/author of the book is Marimo Mori, pseudonym of Kazuo Mori, professor of psychology at Shinshu University. It is the first publisher outside the United Kingdom to officially pay royalties to the book's legal holder, Ragged Bears Publishing.

Book publishing companies of Japan
Mass media in Kyoto